Madhusudhan Rao (born 20 June 1950) is an Indian actor, who has appeared in Tamil, Telugu and Kannada language films. He has appeared in films including Autonagar Surya (2014), Goli Soda (2014), Kathakali (2016), Kaashmora (2016), Adam Joan (2017), Kalakalappu 2 (2018), Aranmanai 3 (2021),Theerpugal Virkapadum (2021) and Taanakkaran (2022).

Career
Madhusudhan Rao made a breakthrough as an actor after appearing as the local rogue, Naidu in Goli Soda (2014). He has since appeared as the antagonist in films such as Vanmam (2014) and Massu Engira Masilamani (2015), as well as in character roles in Jeeva (2014) and Idhu Namma Aalu (2016).  He later starred in Sundar C.’s Kalakalappu 2 (2018) and Aranmanai 3 (2021).

In 2019, he had five releases in Kannada as Birbal Case 1: Finding Vajramuni, Padde Huli, Kempegowda 2, Avane Srimannarayana and Odeya.

Filmography

Television
Chakravakam
Mogali Rekulu

References

External links
 

Living people
Male actors in Tamil cinema
21st-century Indian male actors
Male actors in Telugu cinema
Male actors from Andhra Pradesh
1950 births